Shaler Halimon, Jr. (March 30, 1945 – April 19, 2021) was an American basketball player. He played five seasons in the National Basketball Association (NBA) and American Basketball Association (ABA).

Halimon, a 6'5" swingman from Tampa, Florida, played college basketball at Imperial Valley Community College and Utah State University.  Halimon averaged 25.1 points and 10.2 rebounds per game in his two seasons at Utah State.

At the conclusion of his college career, Halimon was drafted by the Philadelphia 76ers in the first round of the 1968 NBA Draft (14th overall pick).  He played in the NBA for the 76ers, Chicago Bulls, Portland Trail Blazers and Atlanta Hawks and for the Dallas Chaparrals of the ABA. He averaged 6.7 points and 3.4 rebounds per game in the NBA and 6.2 points and 3.1 rebounds in the ABA.

In 1973, Halimon retired from the game. He worked first as a social worker in San Antonio, Texas, then as a city bus driver in Portland, Oregon.  He became a driver for TriMet, the transit agency for the Portland metropolitan area, in 1978. The agency named him its "Bus operator of the year" in 2010". He retired from TriMet in 2012.

Halimon died on April 19, 2021.

References

1945 births
2021 deaths
American men's basketball players
Atlanta Hawks players
Basketball players from Tampa, Florida
Chicago Bulls players
Dallas Chaparrals players
Junior college men's basketball players in the United States
People from Tigard, Oregon
Philadelphia 76ers draft picks
Philadelphia 76ers players
Portland Trail Blazers players
Romulus Senior High School alumni
Shooting guards
Small forwards
Utah State Aggies men's basketball players